Aime Sügis (born 21 January 1935, in Tallinn) is an Estonian chemist and politician. She was a member of VII Riigikogu.

References

Living people
1935 births
Estonian women chemists
Members of the Riigikogu, 1992–1995
Women members of the Riigikogu
Tallinn University of Technology alumni
Politicians from Tallinn